Adema or ADEMA may refer to:

People

Surname
Adema is a West Frisian patronymic surname. People with this surname include:
Auke Adema (1907–1976), Dutch speed skater, twice winner of the Elfstedentocht
:es:Gerhardus Jan Adema (1888–1981), Dutch sculptor and painter
Joost Adema (born 28 September 1959), Dutch rower
Wim Hora Adema (1914–1998), Dutch feminist author and publisher

Given name
Adema Sangale, Kenyan business woman
Adema Santa (1930–1984), Brazilian mixed martial artist

Politics
Alliance for Democracy in Mali, Malian political party

Music
Adema (band), American nu metal band
Adema (album), their debut album

Sports
AS Adema, Malagasy football club

See also
Edema

Patronymic surnames